Paul Collins (born March 1940 in Melbourne, Australia) is an Australian historian, broadcaster and writer currently based in Canberra.

Collins has a master's degree in theology from Harvard University and a Ph.D. in history from the Australian National University (ANU). He has taught church history and theology in Australia, the United States and Pacific countries and worked as a Catholic parish priest in Sydney and Hobart. He has been a visiting fellow at the Centre for Resource and Environmental Studies at the ANU and the Ethel Hayton Visiting Fellow in Religion and Society at the University of Wollongong.

Collins has written for many Australian newspapers and magazines as well as for The Tablet, the National Catholic Reporter in the United States and for several Catholic magazines in Germany.

Collins is a lifelong supporter of the Richmond Football Club in Melbourne.

Doctrinal controversy

The Vatican’s investigation centred on his 1997 book Papal Power, which was said to imply that "a true and binding revelation" does not exist; to deny that the Church of Christ is identified with the Catholic Church and to deny the doctrine of papal infallibility. Collins was further accused of holding the view that a teaching, to be considered church doctrine, must be approved through the sensus fidelium – the "sense of the faithful" – as well as by bishops and theologians.

In March 2001 he resigned from his role as a Catholic priest due to a dispute with the Vatican’s Congregation for the Doctrine of the Faith over his book, Papal Power.

In explaining his resignation, Collins cited the increasing rigidity and sectarianism of the Vatican, stating that the August 2000 declaration Dominus Iesus expressed "a profoundly anti-ecumenical spirit at odds with the sense of God’s grace permeating the whole cosmos".

Subsequent publications

In 2002, Collins published The Modern Inquisition (Overlook Press), containing interviews with Father Tissa Balasuriya, Father Hans Küng, Father Charles Curran, Lavinia Byrne, Sister Jeannine Gramick and Father Robert Nugent, describing their experiences with the Congregation for the Doctrine of the Faith.

Indications of resignation of Pope Benedict XVI
Collins suggested that the elevation of Pope Benedict XVI's personal assistant, Georg Gänswein, to Archbishop in early December 2012 (he was ordained as Bishop on 6 January 2013) was an indication of the impending resignation of Benedict XVI. Such elevations of the Pope's personal secretary have, previously, normally occurred only shortly before the death of a Pope, but while the Pope is still lucid.

Writings 
Mixed Blessings (Penguin Books, 1986)
No Set Agenda: Australia’s Catholic Church faces an uncertain future (David Lovell Publishing, 1992)
God's Earth: Religion as if matter really mattered (Harper Collins, 1995)
Papal Power: A proposal for change in Catholicism's third millennium (Harper Collins, 1997)
Upon This Rock: The popes and their changing role (Melbourne University Press, 2000)
From Inquisition to Freedom: Seven prominent Catholics and their struggle with the Vatican (Simon and Schuster, 2001)
Hell's Gates: The terrible journey of Alexander Pearce, Van Diemen's Land cannibal (Hardie Grant, 2002)
Between The Rock and a Hard Place: Being Catholic today (ABC Books, 2004)
God's New Man: The legacy of Pope John Paul II and the election of Benedict XVI (Melbourne University Press, 2006)
Burn: The epic story of bushfire in Australia (Allen & Unwin, 2006)
Believers: Does Australian Catholicism have a Future? (UNSW Press, 2008)
Judgment Day: The struggle for life on Earth (UNSW Press, 2010)
The birth of the West: Rome, Germany, France, and the Creation of Europe in the Tenth Century (The Perseus Books Group, 2013)
A Very Contrary Irishman: The life and travels of Jeremiah O'Flynn (Morning Star, 2014)
Absolute Power: How the Pope became the most influential man in the world (PublicAffairs, 2018)

References

External links 
 Profile on HarperCollins website
 Official Paul Collins website

Australian religious writers
Dissident Roman Catholic theologians
Living people
1940 births
Australian historians
Australian National University alumni
Harvard Divinity School alumni